The Lover is a 1992 romantic drama film produced by Claude Berri and directed by Jean-Jacques Annaud. Based on the semi-autobiographical 1984 novel of the same name by Marguerite Duras, the film details the illicit affair between a teenage French girl and a wealthy Chinese man in 1929 French Indochina. The protagonist is portrayed by actress Jane March and her lover is portrayed by actor Tony Leung Ka-fai. The film also features Jeanne Moreau as a narrator.

Development began in 1989, with principal photography commencing in 1991. The film made its theatrical debut on 22 January 1992 in France, on 19 June in the United Kingdom, and in the United States on 30 October of the same year. The film was nominated for the 1992 Academy Award for Best Cinematography and won the Motion Picture Sound Editors' 1993 Golden Reel Award for "Best Sound Editing — Foreign Feature". It was nominated for seven César Awards in France, winning the Award for Best Original Music. The film was a box office success in France and received generally positive reviews in Europe, while reviews from American critics were more mixed.

Synopsis 
The primary characters are known only as The Young Girl and The Chinese Man. The events take place in Vietnam. The daughter of a bitter, fearful, poverty-stricken French family, living in a rural area, she wears an old linen dress and a fedora, and paints her lips bright red when out of her mother's sight. Her weak-willed, widowed mother is a schoolteacher to local children. There is a violent, opium-smoking older brother, and a timid younger brother. The girl is a loner but an excellent student, who dreams of being a writer.

The girl meets the Chinese Man when crossing the river on the ferry to return to the city after a school holiday. He is the son of a businessman whose fortune was made in real estate, and has recently returned from Paris after finishing his business studies. He has the look but lacks the self-assurance of the playboy he fancies himself to be, and he is mesmerized the first time he sees her standing by the rail on a crowded ferry crossing the Mekong River. After some awkward conversation, she accepts a lift to Saigon in his chauffeur-driven limousine. In voice-over at the beginning of the film she says she is 15, but she tells him she is 17; he is 32. During the drive he tremulously takes her hand; at the end, his hand is in her lap. The following day, he waits for her outside her boarding school and takes her to the room in the Chinese quarter that he uses for entertaining mistresses.

They realize that "a future together is unthinkable" because she is scheduled to return to Paris soon, and he is to make an arranged marriage with a Chinese heiress. Aware of the limited time they have together, they fall into a relationship in which they shed all responsibilities that come with commitment. Every day after school, the girl goes to his room, where they have passionate sex.

The girl's family discovers the affair, and though at first furious, they condone it because the man is wealthy and can pay off some of their debts. Despite this added tension, the affair continues passionately. The man even goes so far as to beg his father for permission to be with her instead of entering into his arranged marriage, but his father would rather see him dead than with a white girl. Though devastated, the man marries his arranged bride, and the girl boards a ship days later to return to France.

Decades later, she has become a successful writer. In the final scene, she tells us that the Chinese Man is visiting France and has telephoned her. He tells her that he has never stopped loving her, and never will.

Cast 
 Jane March as The Young Girl
 Tony Leung Ka-fai as The Chinese Man
 Frédérique Meininger as The Mother
 Arnaud Giovaninetti as The Elder Brother
 Melvil Poupaud as The Younger Brother
 Lisa Faulkner as Helene Lagonelle
 Xiem Mang as The Chinese Man's Father
 Philippe Le Dem as The French Teacher
 Ann Schaufuss as Anne-Marie Stretter
 Jeanne Moreau as Narrator (voice)

Soundtrack

Production 
Director Jean-Jacques Annaud initially collaborated with Marguerite Duras on the adaptation of her book, but creative differences between the pair led to Annaud working with writer Gérard Brach instead. Annaud and Brach changed the age of "The Girl" from 15 to 17 before deciding they would have her state in the beginning she is 15 while lying to her lover that she is 17, but tried to maintain the original structure and literary tone of the original novel. As with the Duras novel, none of the characters use names and are referred to in the credits as "The Girl" and "The Man". To find the actress who would play the girl, Annaud advertised in multiple cities in the United States and the United Kingdom and visited drama schools. However, it was Annaud's wife, Laurence Duval Annaud, who came upon a photograph of Jane March, a 16-year-old British model, in a teen fashion magazine and brought her to his attention.

When filming began 14 January 1991, March was two months away from turning 18. Annaud chose to shoot the film in English instead of French in order to secure international distribution and to accommodate for the actress.

Annaud first flew to Ho Chi Minh City in Vietnam in 1989 to view the original novel's setting, but was greatly disappointed at the state of the country. In an interview with the Los Angeles Times, he stated that the "best colonial hotel" offered "rats as big as this running through the corridors, spiders everywhere, and no air conditioning, of course. When we tried to use the sink, three drops of brown water—I presume from the Red River—came out of the faucet."
He initially decided against filming in the country and began scouting locations in Malaysia, Thailand and the Philippines—all countries that have been used as settings to represent Vietnam in other Western films. A year later, he returned to his original choice, feeling no other country could truly represent the "tired museum". According to Annaud and MGM Studios, it was the first Western film to be shot in the country since the reunification of the country in 1975.
The government welcomed the crew, providing them with a governmental helicopter for use during filming. However, the filmmakers were required to clear all production storyboards with officials before they could be filmed, and an official remained on set at all times. All of the film's sexual scenes had to be shot in Paris as officials forbade them to be filmed on location. It took 135 days to complete filming, and due to the importation costs of shooting in Vietnam, the film cost $30 million to produce.

Release 

After its completion, the film was first screened in Saigon where it was well received by the "morally minded" guests. The Lover debuted theatrically in France on 22 January 1992. Its first English release came in the United Kingdom 19 June 1992. The film was licensed for release in the United States by MGM Studios, but for its theatrical debut, it first had to get past opposition by the Motion Picture Association of America. The organization gave the original film an MPAA rating of NC-17. MGM appealed after cutting 12 minutes of the film. Coupled with pleas from Annaud, MGM, and a sex educator who argued that the cut version was no more illicit than the 1992 sexual thriller Basic Instinct, the film's rating was changed to R. The film was released in American theaters on 30 October 1992.

Jane March was forced to deny rumours from British tabloids that she and Tony Leung Ka-fai did not simulate their sex scenes. Jean-Jacques Annaud had falsely implied the sex was real to boost publicity for the film, saying "Whether it is simulated or experienced is of little importance to me," leading the tabloids to trumpet the rumour on their front pages for days. The publicity became so difficult for March and her family that she had a nervous breakdown and fled to the Seychelles to escape scrutiny. Annaud later admitted the sex was not real, saying "I myself am flattered people believed [the sex]. But after a while it became embarrassing. I stopped doing press in England. It was a no-win situation."

Box office 
The film was a box office success in France, taking in 626,891 admissions its opening weekend and playing in a total of 229 theaters. In total the film received 3,156,124 admissions in France, becoming the seventh-highest-grossing film of 1992. In the United States, The Lover grossed $4,899,194 in box office receipts during a limited release to 103 theaters.

Home media 
An uncut version of the film was released to Region 1 DVD on 11 December 2001 with audio tracks in English and French and subtitles in English, French, and Spanish.

The Lover was released on Blu-ray in Germany in 2011 under the title Der Liebhaber. It is not region locked and comes with subtitle and audio tracks available in German and English. It received a FSK ab 12 freigegeben rating.

Critical response 
On Rotten Tomatoes, The Lover holds a 28% approval rating based on 25 reviews, with an average rating of 4.8/10. 

Vincent Canby of The New York Times praised the film, calling it "something of a triumph" and a "tough, clear-eyed, utterly unsentimental" film that was "produced lavishly but with such discipline that the exotic locale never gets in the way of the minutely detailed drama at the center." He also complimented the performances of Tony Leung and Jane March, noting she is "wonderful" and a "nymphet beauty" in her film debut. The staff of Variety praised Leung's performance as well, writing that he "is excellent as the shiftless scion whose love for the girl makes him emotionally naked and vulnerable." David Ansen of Newsweek wrote: "The Lover'''s rarefied sensibility takes getting used to; once its spell is cast, you won't want to blink."

Roger Ebert of the Chicago Sun-Times compared the film to Emmanuelle or the Playboy and Penthouse erotic videos, "in which beautiful actors and elegant photography provide a soft-core sensuality. As an entry in that genre, The Lover is more than capable, and the movie is likely to have a long life on video as the sort of sexy entertainment that arouses but does not embarrass." He continued, "Is The Lover any good as a serious film? Not really. Annaud and his collaborators have got all of the physical details just right, but there is a failure of the imagination here; we do not sense the presence of real people behind the attractive facades of the two main actors."

Desson Thomson of the Washington Post observed, "Director Jean-Jacques Annaud and adapter Gerard Brach provide more than a few effective moments...But the story is dramatically not that interesting. After establishing the affair and its immediate problems, Lover never quite rises to the occasion. Scratch away the steamy, evocative surface, remove Jeanne Moreau's veteran-voiced narration, and you have only art-film banalities."
Owen Gleiberman of Entertainment Weekly gave the film a grade of C, calling it "one more movie that titillates us with the prospect of taking sex seriously and then dampens our interest by taking it too seriously. Why do so many filmmakers insist on staging erotic encounters as if they were some sort of hushed religious ritual? The answer, of course, is that they're trying to dignify sex. But sex isn't dignified — it's messy and playful and abandoned. In The Lover, director Jean-Jacques Annaud gives us the sweating and writhing without the spontaneity and surprise."

In the United Kingdom, Channel 4 noted "the nameless characters bring to mind Last Tango's search for identity through passion, and there's a shade of Ai No Corrida's intensity. But there is none of the substance that made those two films such landmarks of their genre, and while March and Leung are an attractive pair, the glossy look and aloof direction of the film leaves you cold."
The critic for Time Out London thought its "sombre quality dignifies an otherwise shoddily directed movie" that is "basically a melancholic piece about the remembrance of times, places and passions lost." The critic felt the role of the Young Girl was "altogether too complex for the inexperienced March to do more than simply embody."

Marguerite Duras distanced herself from the finished film and said she wrote another version of the book in response to Annaud's adaptation.

 Accolades The Lover'' was nominated for the 1992 Academy Award for Best Cinematography
and won the 1993 Motion Picture Sound Editors' Golden Reel Award for "Best Sound Editing — Foreign Feature".
At the 1993 César Awards in France, it was nominated for seven awards, winning in the category of Best Original Music for Gabriel Yared's score.

References

External links 
 
 
 
 

1990s English-language films
Cantonese-language films
Vietnamese-language films
1990s erotic drama films
Films set in boarding schools
Erotic romance films
Films about interracial romance
Films about sexuality
Films directed by Jean-Jacques Annaud
Films based on French novels
Films based on works by Marguerite Duras
Films set in the 1920s
Romantic period films
Films set in French Indochina
Films set in Saigon
Films shot in Vietnam
French-language Vietnamese films
French multilingual films
Metro-Goldwyn-Mayer films
Films about virginity
Films scored by Gabriel Yared
French erotic drama films
British erotic drama films
French romantic drama films
British romantic drama films
Films produced by Claude Berri
Films with screenplays by Gérard Brach
Vietnamese historical drama films
English-language French films
1992 multilingual films
Fiction set in 1929
1992 romantic drama films
1992 films
1990s British films
1990s French films